The Rodeo Hall of Fame is part of the National Cowboy & Western Heritage Museum in Oklahoma City, Oklahoma, United States.

Rodeo Hall of Fame may also refer to

Bull Riding Hall of Fame, located in Fort Worth, Texas, United States
Canadian Pro Rodeo Hall of Fame, located in Ponoka, Alberta, Canada
ProRodeo Hall of Fame, located in Colorado Springs, Colorado, United States

See also
National Cowgirl Museum and Hall of Fame, located in Fort Worth, Texas